The Koudounia, are bell-like percussion instruments. Most often, they are made from copper and upon playing (that is, hitting them with a stick) they give out a special ringing sound. Originally the koudounia had been used as an amulet which protected the animals from evil spirits. Later, the koudounia  became an auxiliary musical instrument.

See also

Greek musical instruments
Greek folk music

References
Koudounia, the origin of auxiliary instrument
Musipedia: Kουδουνια
The koudounakia
 History of koudhounia

Greek musical instruments
Greek music